Following the Sack of Ayutthaya and the collapse of the Ayutthaya Kingdom (1351–1767) during the Burmese–Siamese War (1765–1767), a power vacuum left Siam divided into 5 separate states—Phimai, Phitsanulok, Sawangburi, Nakhon Si Thammarat, and Thonburi. The state of Thonburi, led by Taksin, would ultimately prevail, subjugating its rivals to successfully reunify Siam under the Thonburi Kingdom (1767–1782) by 1770/71.

Background

Origin of Phraya Tak 
Phraya Tak was born in 1734 with the name Sin or Zheng Xin (鄭新). His father was a Teochew Chinese merchant and tax collector named Zheng Yong (鄭鏞) who had earlier immigrated from Huafu (華富) village in Chenghai, Guangdong Province to serve in Siam. His mother was named Nok-iang and was of either Siamese or Chinese ethnicity. The story of the early formative years of Phraya Tak is mostly drawn from Miraculous Deeds of Ancestors, a work that was officially published in 1930 and may be attributed to the Thai historian K.S.R. Kulap. According to this narrative, Sin was adopted by a Siamese high-ranking minister and rose through the ranks of Ayutthayan bureaucracy. However, this work was possibly written more than a century after the described events and its historical verifiability is questionable, leading some modern scholars to consider this narrative ahistorical. Most of the sources composed in early Rattanakosin Period described Phraya Tak as being originally a simple Chinese caravan merchant who used his money to buy the position of governorship of Tak town from the court of Ayutthaya. Nevertheless, Sin was appointed as the governor of Tak in 1764 with the title of Phraya Tak. By 1765, Phraya Tak was commanded by the Ayutthayan court to join the defense of the city against the Burmese invasion. Very little was known about Phraya Tak before 1765 as few historical evidences survived.

Burmese Invasions of Ayutthaya 
The Mon King Binnya Dala of Hanthawaddy Kingdom seized the Burmese royal city of Ava in 1752, toppling the centuries-old Burmese Toungoo dynasty. The power vacuum left Aung Zeiya, a local Burmese man of Moksobo village (modern Shwebo), to quickly rise powerful in his resistance against the Mon rule. Aung Zeiya declared himself King Alaungpaya of the newfound Konbaung dynasty in 1752. Alaungpaya consolidated his powers in Upper Burma and invaded Lower Burma, which had been under the rule of the Mon Hanthawaddy Kingdom. In 1757, Alaungpaya destroyed the Mon royal capital of Pegu and dissolved the Mon kingdom, unifying both upper and lower Burma under his rule.

After the death of Prince Thammathibet in 1755 in a political incident, King Borommakot of Ayutthaya decided to skip his second son Ekathat in favor of his third son Uthumphon born to his principal queens to be appointed as the new heir, citing the incompetency of Ekathat as the reason of his decision. Borommakot died in April 1758. Three other sons of Borommakot, known as the Three Princes or Chao Sam Krom, who were born to Borommakot's secondary consorts, competed for the throne against Uthumphon, resulting in a grand civil war in May 1758. Even though Uthumphon prevailed, he sat for barely a month on the throne as he felt the pressure to relinquish the throne to his elder brother Ekathat. Uthumphon abdicated in June 1758 and became a Buddhist monk, earning him the epithet Khun Luang Hawat ("the king who seeks the temple"). Ekathat eventually ascended the throne as the last king of Ayutthaya. Prince Kromma Muen Thepphiphit, another son of Borommakot and a political ally of Uthumphon, came up with a conspiracy to overthrow Ekathat and reinstate Uthumphon. However, the seditious plot was leaked and Prince Thepphiphit was exiled to Sri Lanka in 1758.

In January 1760, King Alaungpaya of Burma sent his vanguard army to conquer the Siamese-held towns of Mergui and Tenasserim. Alaungpaya then quickly led his armies to lay siege on Ayutthaya in April 1760. The royal city of Ayutthaya had not been threatened at doorsteps by external invaders since 1587. However, the annual flooding of Ayutthaya and the illness of Alaungpaya compelled the Burmese to retreat. Alaungpaya died on his way back to Burma on that occasion. After involving in a political conflict in Sri Lanka, Prince Thepphiphit was repatriated to Siam in 1762, arriving at the port-town of Tenasserim. King Ekathat was surprised by the return of his half-brother. Ekathat confined the returning Prince Thepphiphit in Chanthaburi on the eastern coast. 

Burma conquered Lanna in 1763 and Lao kingdoms of Luang Phrabang and Vientiane in 1765, securing all of the Siamese northern frontiers. In September 1765, the new king Hsinbyushin launched a pincer-movement campaign against Siam by commanding his forces to invade both from the north and the west to converge on Ayutthaya. The Siamese peripheral towns offered little to no resistance as the royal court adopted a defensive strategy by concentrating Siamese forces only in Ayutthaya itself. By February 1766, the Burmese again reached the outskirts of Ayutthaya and laid siege. Chaophraya Phrakhlang led the Siamese forces to attack the Burmese encampments in the northern suburbs. However, Phrakhlang was defeated and retreated. Only with the rear-protection by Phraya Tak that Phrakhlang managed to retreat safely. Prince Thepphiphit at Chanthaburi volunteered himself to rally against the Burmese and gathered his forces at Prachinburi. However, Prince Thepphiphit was defeated either by the Burmese or by the forces sent by Ekathat, who would never trust his brother. The prince ended up fleeing to Nakhon Ratchasima. In November 1766, Phraya Tak and Phraya Phetchaburi Rueang led the Siamese riverine fleet to face the Burmese at Wat Yai Chai Mongkhon. However, the Siamese were defeated with Phraya Phetchaburi Rueang killed in battle. Phraya Tak was then blamed for the fall of his comrade.

Prince Thepphiphit in Phimai 
After his defeat at Prachinburi, Prince Thepphiphit went through the Dong Phaya Fai Pass to Nakhon Ratchasima (Khorat). Prince Thepphiphit sent gifts to Phraya Nakhon Ratchasima the governor of Nakhon Ratchasima to seek alliance. Phraya Nakhon Ratchasima rejected the offer and threatened to arrest the prince. Prince Thepphiphit then gathered the force of 450 men and assigned his son Prince Prayong to lead the forces secretly in disguise into the Khorat town. Phraya Nakhon Ratchasima was personally ambushed and assassinated by the forces of Prince Prayong on September 17, 1766. Prince Thepphiphit was then able to take control of Nakhon Ratchasima. However, Luang Phaeng, younger brother of Phraya Nakhon Ratchasima, fled to take refuge at Phimai with Phra Phimai the governor of the town. Five days later, on September 22, Phra Phimai and Luang Phaeng brought forces to attack Khorat. Luang Phaeng managed to retake Khorat to avenge the death of his brother on September 26. Sons of Prince Thepphiphit, including Prince Prayong, were executed. Luang Phaeng proposed to execute Prince Thepphiphit but Phra Phimai intervened. Phra Phimai took the prince with him to Phimai.

It turned out that Phra Phimai was loyal to Prince Thepphiphit. Phra Phimai declared Thepphiphit a king at Phimai. Prince Thepphiphit was, therefore, known as Chao Phimai and appointed Phra Phimai as his Prime Minister with the title of Chaophraya Suriyawong. Two sons of Phra Phimai were granted the titles Phraya Mahamontri and Phraya Worawongsa. Phra Phimai devised a plan to kill Luang Phaeng. Phra Phimai visited Luang Phaeng at Khorat. Luang Phaeng was so trusted in friendship with Phra Phimai that he was unsuspicious of any foul plays. When they had been both watching a traditional performance, Phra Phimai rose up and slashed Luang Phaeng to death with his sword. Phra Phimai then took control over the Nakhon Ratchasima town and left his son Phraya Worawongsa to govern the city. The Phimai regime, under the leadership of Prince Thepphiphit, was conceived in late 1766 with its authority extending over the Khorat Plateau.

Journey of Phraya Tak to Chanthaburi

Departure from Ayutthaya 
By January 1767, the situation of Ayutthaya defenders became dire as the food resources depleted and more people kept surrendering to the Burmese besiegers. An earlier incident was that when the Siamese gunpower was low in supplies, King Ekathat ordered that every single Siamese cannon-fire should be pre-permitted by the royal court. Phraya Tak was tried for his unauthorized cannon shot. These events disheartened Phraya Tak. As he became aware that Ayutthaya was incapable of withstanding the Burmese attack, Phraya Tak made his plan to break through the Burmese encirclement to seek for a new position to the east. In the night of January 3, 1767, Phraya Tak gathered his Siamese-Chinese personnel from Ayutthaya, numbering to about 500 men, at Wat Phichai Songkhram temple just outside the eastern city wall of Ayutthaya. These original followers of Phraya Tak included;

 Phra Chiang-ngeon, the governor of the Chiang-ngeon town near Tak
 Luang Phichairacha or Luang Phichai-asa, a son of Phraya Phetchaburi Rueang
 Khun Phiphit Wathi (personal name Chen Lian 陳聯), a Teochew Chinese
 The Cambodian prince Ang Non, who had earlier taken refuge in Ayutthaya in 1758 due to a political conflict in Cambodia

Apart from these, Thai chronicles also mentioned several other minor names that cannot be identified with any personalities in subsequent periods. Phraya Tak's original followers were mostly adventurous mid-ranking officials. In that night, Phraya Tak led his army of followers to successfully break through the Burmese line to the east before midnight. By midnight, a great fire broke out in Ayutthaya so illuminated that can be seen by Phraya Tak. On the next day, on January 4, the Burmese followed and caught up with Phraya Tak at Phosaohan, about twenty kilometers to the east of Ayutthaya. Phraya Tak led his Chinese-Siamese forces to successfully repel the pursuing Burmese. The victory of Phraya Tak at Phosaohan was the first after his departure from Ayutthaya.

On January 5 the next day, a local leader Khun Chamnan Phraison gave six elephants to Phraya Tak. Khun Chamnan Phraison also led Phraya Tak to Ban Dong (modern Nakhon Nayok town), where Phraya Tak met the first local resistance as the local leaders there refused to submit. The inhabitants of Ban Dong themselves formed an autonomous military encampment, numbering about 1,000 men. Phraya Tak led his own forces of inferior number to attack Ban Dong on January 6. The Ban Dong encampment was defeated and surrendered to Phraya Tak.

Phraya Tak continued his journey through Nakhon Nayok, reaching Prachinburi on January 10. Phra Chiang-ngeon followed his master Phraya Tak so slowly that he was left behind. Phraya Tak punished Phra Chiang-ngeon by canning for disobedience. A large Burmese army came from Paknam Cholo on the Bangpakong River towards Phraya Tak at Prachinburi. Phraya Tak then prepared to face the Burmese and stationed his cannons. On January 10, the Burmese reached Phraya Tak at Prachinburi, leading to the Battle of Prachinburi. Phraya Tak ordered all the cannons to fire simultaneously at the Burmese to crush them. This was done three times, only then the Burmese were finally dispersed.

After his victory over the Burmese at Prachinburi, Phraya Tak shifted his journey downstream the Bangpakong River towards the Gulf of Siam, reaching Bang Plasoi (Chonburi) on the eastern coast on January 19. He defeated a local resistance at Pattaya and then continued his journey through Chomthien and Sattahip along the eastern coastline, reaching Rayong on January 25.

Phraya Tak in Rayong 

In late January 1767, Phraya Tak and his retinue reached the outskirts of Rayong town, where the governor of Rayong arrived to meet with Phraya Tak to seek alliance. On January 21, Phraya Tak moved to settle in Wat Lum Mahachai Chumphon in the Rayong town, where Phraya Tak appointed his subordinate Phra Chiang-ngeon as Phra Thainam the commander of royal mercenary forces. Phraya Tak also elevated the ranks of his followers from Khun to Luang. Phraya Tak had appointed his own royal officials even before becoming a king.

Two days later on January 23, however, two men in Rayong informed Phraya Tak that this was a plan to lure Phraya Tak into the trap as the two Rayong officials, namely Khun Ram and Muen Song, were then mustering the forces of 1,500 men from outside the Rayong town to attack Phraya Tak that night. Realizing that he was being deceived, Phraya Tak arrested the governor of Rayong into custody and prepared to face the attacks.

 Luang Chamnan Phraison and Phra Chiang-ngoen commanded the Siamese regiments
 Luang Phiphit Chen Lien and Luang Phichairacha commanded the Chinese regiments

In the night of January 23, 1767, Khun Ram and Muen Song brought the forces into the Rayong town, crossing a bridge. Phraya Tak sent his forces to attack his enemies at the bridge, massacring the attackers who were plunged into the water and defeated. Khun Ram and Muen Song then regrouped at Klaeng, to the east of Rayong.

In February 1767, after his victory in Rayong, Phraya Tak announced his plan to subjugate Chanthaburi to bring all of the eastern Siamese coastline under his control. Phraya Tak first tried diplomacy by sending his delegate to demand submission from Phraya Chanthaburi. During the Burmese siege of Ayutthaya, Chao Khrua Lan had been the governor of Chanthaburi. His name was recorded in Chinese sources as Pu Lan (普蘭). Pu Lan the Phraya Chanthaburi pretended to accept the demands and promised to visit Phraya Tak at Rayong to submit. Phraya Tak waited for ten days without further responses from Phraya Chanthaburi, realizing that Chanthaburi would continue to resist. After their defeat, Khun Ram and Muen Song at Klaeng sent forces to continuously harass Rayong in late March 1767. Phraya Tak then sent forces to attack them. Khun Ram and Muen Song were again defeated and this time fled to Chanthaburi to seek protection from Phraya Chanthaburi.

Phraya Tak also decided to seek military assistance from Hà Tiên, which had been ruled by the Cantonese Mạc Thiên Tứ who had been the most prominent Chinese leader in the area by that time, against the Burmese. Phraya Tak assigned Phraya Phichairacha to bear his "royal letter" to Mạc Thiên Tứ, reaching Hà Tiên on March 28, 1767, which became the first contact between Phraya Tak and Mạc Thiên Tứ. In a flattering letter, Phraya Tak professed himself to be an adopted son of Mạc Thiên Tứ. Phraya Phichairacha returned to Rayong a month later on April 27.

In April 1767, a local man in Chonburi named Thongyoo Noklek declared himself a pirate leader and plundered the merchant ships. Phraya Tak marched his fleet from Rayong to subjugate Thongyoo Noklek by sea. Thongyoo Noklek surrendered and submit to Phraya Tak. Phraya Tak then appointed Thongyoo Noklek as Phraya Anuratburi the governor of Chonburi, urging him to cease his pirate activities. At the time of the fall of Ayutthaya in April 1767, the dominions of Phraya Tak stretched from Chonburi to Rayong on the eastern coast.

Fall of Ayutthaya 
After enduring the Burmese siege for fourteen months, Ayutthaya finally fell to the Burmese invaders on April 7, 1767. The Burmese thoroughly looted and burnt the city to the grounds, putting the end to 417 years of Ayutthaya being a royal city. King Ekathat, the last king of Ayutthaya, died from either starvation a week later or from a random gunshot amidst confusion. Ekathat was ceremonially buried in the royal cremation grounds. The Burmese victors took about 30,000 inhabitants of Ayutthaya, including the former king Uthumphon, other members of royal family and the noble elite class, back to Burma. After their victory, the Burmese were obliged to withdraw most of its forces from Ayutthaya to the upcoming Sino-Burmese War and did not have time to enforce their occupation on Siam. The Burmese forces left Ayutthaya in June 1767, leaving two garrisons at Phosamton to the north of Ayutthaya under the command of the Mon official Thugyi or Suki and at Thonburi under the command of a Siamese man named Thong-in. These two garrisons alone maintained the Burmese presence in Lower Central Siam. Some members of Ayutthayan royal dynasty and nobility, who were unsuitable for long journey, were also left at Phosamton.

Emergence of Warlord Regimes 
The fall of Ayutthaya and the Burmese withdrawal left a huge power vacuum in Siam. Siam descended into anarchy with the absence of central authority. The countryside was in turmoil as little authority existed. Numerous petty chieftains and local leaders declared themselves sovereigns. Prominent regional leaders in Siam after the fall of Ayutthaya included;

 Prince Thepphiphit of Phimai, who had established the Phimai regime at Phimai in late 1766 in the northeast. Out of the five newly established independent rulers, only Thepphitphit would claim legitimacy to the former Ayutthaya Kingdom.
 In the north, Chaophraya Phitsanulok (personal name Rueang), the governor of Phitsanulok, which was the administrative center of Northern Siam, declared himself a ruler at Phitsanulok.
 Chao Phra Fang, a local Buddhist monk, established a theocratic regime at Sawangkhaburi in the northernmost Siamese frontiers with his officials including his fellow red-robe-clad monks.
 In the south, Phraya Ratchasuphawadi the governor of Nakhon Si Thammarat (Ligor) had earlier been commanded to bring forces to join the defense of Ayutthaya. However, Phraya Ratchasuphawadi ended up being imprisoned in Ayutthaya, leaving his deputy Phra Palat Nu to be in charge of Nakhon Si Thammarat. After the fall of Ayutthaya, Phra Palat Nu declared himself Chao Nakhon the ruler of all Southern Siam based in Nakhon Si Thammarat.
 Phraya Tak, who had been in Rayong, also declared himself a ruler.

Conquest of Chanthaburi 

In the Late Ayutthaya Period, the Teochew Chinese people had immigrated to settle in the eastern Siamese coastal port-towns, most notably in Chonburi and Chanthaburi. Chanthaburi had been a leading Chinese entrepôt. Pu Lan the Phraya Chanthaburi had been cooperating with Khun Ram and Muen Song, the enemies of Phraya Tak. Phraya Chanthaburi sent four Buddhists monks to Rayong to invite Phraya Tak to Chanthaburi in April 1767. Despite knowing it was a trap, Phraya Tak decided to go anyway but not alone. He took two months to prepare his army for the conquest of Chanthaburi. The conquest of Chanthaburi was a turning point in Phraya Tak's career as he would rise from local to regional leader. Phraya Tak and his retinue left Rayong in June 1767, travelling to Chanthaburi by land. Phraya Chanthaburi sent his delegates to intercept Phraya Tak to lure Phraya Tak into crossing the Chanthaburi River where the Chanthaburi forces had been waiting to ambush. Phraya Tak commanded his retinue to stop going that way and instead took position at Tha Chang in the northern outskirts of Chanthaburi.

Phraya Tak stayed at Wat Kaew where he encamped and established military defenses. Phraya Chanthaburi also stationed his defensive forces on the city wall. Chanthaburi sent a delegate to meet Phraya Tak, urging Phraya Tak to go into the city. Phraya Tak insisted that Phraya Chanthaburi should come to meet him at Wat Kaew. Phraya Tak also told Phraya Chanthaburi to surrender Khun Ram and Muen Song to Phraya Tak. In the evening of June 15, 1767, Phraya Tak ordered his forces to consume all the remaining food supplies and to destroy all of the cooking pots, pressing that the victory must be accomplished before the next meal. This was done to create a strong urge to successfully take Chanthaburi as, if they failed to do, they would die either in fighting or from starvation. According to a popular version of oral history, he said, "We are going to attack Chanthaburi tonight. Destroy all the food and utensils we have, for we will have our food in Chanthaburi tomorrow morning."

Phraya Tak led his forces to assault on Chanthaburi in the night of June 15. Chanthaburi responded with rains of ammunition. A bullet happened to narrowly miss Phraya Tak, who was riding on an elephant. The elephant mahout commanded the elephant to retreat for safety but Phraya Tak threatened to execute the mahout for disobedience and instead used his knife to puncture his elephant, causing it a great pain as it ran amok to destroy the city gate of Chanthaburi. Chanthaburi fell to Phraya Tak in the night of June 15. Phraya Chanthaburi and his family fled to take refuge in Hà Tiên.

Conquest of Trat 
After taking Chanthaburi, Phraya Tak and his forces proceeded by land to Trat, the easternmost Siamese port-town on the eastern coast. Phraya Tak found the Teochew Chinese merchant-pirates anchoring at the port of Trat who refused to submit. Phraya Tak then ordered his forces to attack the Chinese pirates. The fighting occurred for half a day until Phraya Tak eventually prevailed. Many of the Chinese pirates were killed in the battle. Chiam the leader of the pirates submitted to Phraya Tak. De Fels proposed that Chiam was the same person as Chen Tai (陳太, called Trần Thái in Vietnamese), the Teochew Chinese pirate who had earlier attacked Hà Tiên but was defeated by the forces of Mạc Thiên Tứ. With the conquest of Trat, Phraya Tak put the whole eastern Siamese coastline stretching from Chonburi to Trat under his control.

Reconquest of Ayutthaya 
Phraya Tak spent three months assembling his navy at a shipyard dock in Ban Samet Ngam, Chanthaburi. In October 1767, at the end of monsoon season, Phraya Tak and his retinue, numbering to 5,000 men, which was ten times larger than his original forces of 500 men when he left Ayutthaya earlier the same year, left Chanthaburi for Chao Phraya River. When he reached Chonburi, Phraya Tak learned that Thongyoo Noklek, whom he had appointed the governor of Chonburi, was still engaging in pirate activities. Phraya Tak then had Thongyoo Noklek arrested and executed by drowning.

Battle of Phosamton 
Phraya Tak reached the Paknam Samut Prakarn and proceeded to Thonburi, then a small port just 20 km to the Gulf of Thailand, across the Chao Phraya River from present-day Bangkok, where the Burmese garrison was commanded by the Siamese man Thong-in, on November 4, 1767. Phraya Tak clashed with Thong-in at the Thonburi fort, leading to the Battle of Thonburi on November 4. Phraya Tak prevailed as Thong-in was killed in battle. He then went on to attack the Burmese at Phosamton to the north.

Suki or Thugyi, the Mon commander of the Burmese garrison at Phosamton to the north of Ayutthaya, took defensive positions as Phraya Tak approached. Phraya Tak and his riparian navy sailed upstream the Chao Phraya and eventually reached Phosamton the next day on November 5, leading to the Battle of Phosamton. Suki encamped his defense on both sides of a canal. Phraya Tak's armies managed to capture the east side of the Phosamton encampment, with Suki himself persisting on the west side. Phraya Tak ordered the assault on the western Phosamton, with Phraya Phiphit Chen Lian and Phraya Phichairacha commanding the Chinese regiment as vanguard. In the morning of November 6 the next day, the Chinese regiment attacked Suki. Suki persisted until noon when he was defeated and killed in battle. Few hundred Burmese guarding the garrison were massacred. The Burmese garrison of Phosamton fell to Phraya Tak on November 6, 1767, within seven months after the Fall of Ayutthaya. Phraya Tak managed to seize the Burmese Phosamton camp within two days and his victory at Phosamton was symbolic of liberation of Siam from Burmese occupation.

With the capture of two Burmese garrisons at Thonburi and Phosamton by Phraya Tak in November 1767, the Burmese occupation of Lower Central Siam was virtually eliminated and Phraya Tak took control of the area. Phraya Tak stayed at the house of the deceased Suki, where he received submission from Phraya Thibetbodi the most senior of the remaining Ayutthaya nobles in Phosamton. Phraya Tak found the surviving members of the former royal dynasty and the nobility at Phosamton to be in a deplorable state. Two princesses had already died from illness and poor living conditions. Phraya Tak then ordered the body of the former king Ekathat to be exhumed and given an abbreviated proper royal cremation ceremonies. Phraya Tak rode an elephant to take a look on the city of Ayutthaya. He found the former Siamese royal city to be in ruins, with human corpses and bones scattering around. Phraya Tak initially intended to restore Ayutthaya as the capital city of Siam. However, according to Thai chronicles, that night, Phraya Tak slept at the Ayutthayan royal palace. He dreamt that the former kings of Ayutthaya dismissed him and urged him to leave Ayutthaya. Phraya Tak then decided that Ayutthaya was too ruinous to be restored in a short period of time as he needed a defendable fortress against possible Burmese repercussions. Realizing that Ayutthaya would be difficult to defend against the Burmese, Phraya Tak made the Thonburi port-town near the mouth of Chaophraya his base and capital with close proximity to the sea.

Enthronement of King Taksin 
Phraya Tak initially intended to reestablish Ayutthaya as his capital. For strategic reasons, however, Phraya Tak decided not to make his base at Ayutthaya. One of the reason for his decision was the vast destruction inflicted on the former royal city of Ayutthaya itself. Phraya Tak founded Thonburi as his new capital, only twenty kilometers from the Gulf of Siam, to be a suitable port for commerce. There had been a fort (modern Wichaiprasit fort) built by the French at Thonburi in the seventeenth century. Phraya Tak constructed the Thonburi Palace to be his residence just at the fort. Phraya Tak performed the coronation ceremony on December 28, 1767 at the Thonburi Palace. His regnal name was Boromaraja IV but he was known posthumously and popularly as King Taksin—combining his former title Phraya Tak and his personal name Sin. However, the new capital of Thonburi was left bare until 1771 when he king ordered the city moat to be dug and the city wall was erected from the coral tree timber.

Battle of Bangkung 

As the Burmese had largely evacuated Siam and had been preoccupied with the Sino-Burmese War, according to Thai chronicles, King Hsinbyushin of Burma ordered the Burmese governor of Tavoy with the name of Maengki Manya (Thai: แมงกี้มารหญ้า) to lead a scouting force through the Three Pagodas Pass into Siam to investigate the situation in 1768. Maengki Manya led the forces of 2,000 Tavoyan men into Siam, marching through Kanchanaburi and reached Bang Kung on the Mae Klong River in Samut Songkhram, which had been a Chinese community town, to the west of Thonburi. King Taksin was incognizant about this Burmese advance and was informed only when the Burmese had already attacked the Chinese inhabitants of Bang Kung. The local Chinese took up the defense for themselves at Wat Bang Kung but the Maengki Manya pressed on heavily. King Taksin assigned Phra Mahamontri Boonma as his vanguard with himself leading the Siamese troops to repel the Burmese at Bang Kung, going by sea with twenty vessels. The situation for the Chinese defenders of Bang Kung was critical but King Taksin managed to arrive on time and defeat the Burmese in the Battle of Bangkung in 1768. Maengki Manya the governor of Tavoy was defeated and retreated. The Battle of Bangkung was the first victory of King Taksin over the Burmese after his enthronement as king.

Reunification of Siam

Battle of Koeichai 
After taking control of Lower Central Siam, King Taksin of Thonburi then began his campaigns to subjugate the rival warlord regimes and to unify Siam. He first moved against the Phitsanulok regime to the north, whose leader was Chaophraya Phitsanulok Rueang the governor of Phitsanulok before the Fall of Ayutthaya. Many noblemen of the former Ayutthayan elite class had fled to take refuge in regional centers including Phitsanulok, Nakhon Si Thammarat and Phimai, which had become the seats of rival regimes. In 1768, King Taksin marched his combined Chinese-Siamese armies north to attack Phitsanulok, reaching Koeichai in modern Nakhon Sawan province. Chaophraya Phitsanulok sent his commander Luang Kosa Yang down south to face Taksin at Koeichai, leading to the Battle of Koeichai in 1768. King Taksin and the Thonburi armies were defeated with the king himself got shot at his left leg. Taksin and his armies then retreated south to Thonburi.

After his victory at Koeichai, Chaophraya Phitsanulok Rueang declared himself king in Phitsanulok and underwent a coronation ceremony. Chaophraya Phitsanulok also appointed Phra Aksorn Sunthon ( personal name Thongdi, father of the future King Rama I) as his Samuha Nayok or Prime Minister. However, Chaophraya Phitsanulok Rueang died shortly after from a coughing fit or tuberculosis. He was succeeded by his younger brother Phra In-akorn as the leader of the Phitsanulok regime. Phra Aksorn Sunthon also fell ill and passed away in 1768. Phra In-akorn was proved not to be as competent as his elder brother. Chao Phra Fang, the monk-leader of the theocratic regime of Sawangkhaburi, marched to lay siege on Phitsanulok. Phra In-akorn managed to hold the city for three months until when Chao Phra Fang attacked and successfully seized Phitsanulok in 1768 or 1770. Phra In-akorn was executed and the Phitsanulok regime was incorporated into the regime of Chao Phra Fang. The inhabitants and ammunitions of Phitsanulok were transported to Sawangkhaburi. However, the old nobles who had supported Chaophraya Phitsanulok Rueang gave Chao Phra Fang no supports. Those who were dissatisfied with the rule of Chao Phra Fang migrated south to Thonburi.

Subjugation of the Phimai regime 
After his defeat and injury from Koeichai, in 1768, King Taksin recovered and initiated his new campaign to subjugate the Phimai regime to the northeast on the Khorat plateau, which was ruled by the Ayutthayan prince Kromma Muen Thepphiphit who was a son of King Borommakot. Prince Thepphiphit had been a major political figure as he, alone among the five regional contenders, laid claim to the fallen Ayutthayan dynasty and had attracted a large number of followers. Prince Thepphiphit's right hand was Phra Phimai, who served as the Prime Minister, and Phra Phimai's son Phraya Worawongsa governed the city of Nakhon Ratchasima or Khorat. Mongya, a Burmese commander defeated at Phosamton previously in 1767, fled to seek protection under Prince Thepphiphit at Phimai. Taksin declared that he would send armies to pursue and punish Mongya. King Taksin assigned his two commanders Phra Ratchawarin Thongduang (King Rama I) and Phra Mahamontri Boonma (Prince Sura Singhanat) as vanguard with the king himself leading the forces to subjugate the Phimai regime in 1768.

Prince Thepphiphit, upon being informed about the invasion from Thonburi, assigned his own forces to guard the Khorat city;

 Phraya Worawongsa would guard the Khorat town at Dan Khun Thot pass to the west of the city.
 Phra Phimai, his son Phraya Mahamontri and Mongya the Burmese commander would station at Choho to the of north the Khorat city.

King Taksin led his Thonburi armies, crossing the Dong Phaya Fai pass to attack Nakhon Ratchasima. He sent the vanguard under Phra Ratchawarin and Phra Mahamontri to attack Phraya Worawongsa at Dan Khun Thot. King Taksin attacked the Phimai forces at Choho. The Thonburi forces eventually prevailed in both Choho and Dan Khun Thot. Phra Phimai, his son Phraya Mahamontri and Mongya were all captured and executed, while Phraya Worawongsa managed to flee to Siemreap in Cambodia. King Taksin commanded Phra Ratchawarin and Phra Mahamontri to pursue Phraya Worawongsa to Cambodia. However, they were unable to find Worawongsa. King Taksin was then able to take control of Nakhon Ratchasima.

Prince Thepphiphit at Phimai, upon learning of the defeats and deaths of his minister-generals, fled towards Laos. However, a minor Khorat official named Khun Chana (personal name Boonkhong) managed to personally arrest Prince Thepphiphit and his family and brought them to Taksin. Taksin was rejoiced and rewarded Khun Chana by appointing him as Phraya Kamhaeng Songkhram the new governor of Nakhon Ratchasima under Thonburi regime. After his victory, King Taksin brought Prince Thepphiphit and his family to Thonburi. In an audience, Thepphiphit was summoned before Taksin. Prince Thepphiphit, taking the pride of an Ayutthayan prince, refused to kowtow before King Taksin. Prince Thepphiphit was then executed by being crushed to death with sandalwood club by the orders of King Taksin in 1768. The prince's daughter, Princess Ubol, became a consort of King Taksin. Phra Ratchawarin and Phra Mahamontri were promoted to Phraya Aphai Ronnarit and Phraya Anuchit Racha the commander of the right and left royal guard regiments, respectively.

Conquest of Southern Siam 
After the Fall of Ayutthaya, Phra Palat Nu the deputy governor of Nakhon Si Thammarat (Ligor) who had been in charge of the city declared himself a ruler. His power extended over the whole Southern Siam. Phra Palat Nu became known as Chaophraya Nakhon Nu the ruler of Ligor. Nakhon Nu appointed his nephew-in-law Chan, who was a son of Chaophraya Chamnan Borrirak, as his Uparat or heir. The Malay sultanates that used to send bunga mas tributes to Ayutthaya nullified their tributary ties with Siam. In 1769, King Taksin of Thonburi initiated a new campaign to subjugate the Southern Siamese regime of Nakhon Nu. Taksin assigned Chaophraya Chakri Mud the Muslim Prime Minister to lead the Thonburi armies of 5,000 men down south to conquer Southern Siam. Other commanders included Phraya Yommaraj, Phraya Siphiphat and Phraya Phetchaburi. The Thonburi troops marched from Phetchaburi to Pathio. The Southern Siamese inhabitants of Pathio and Chumphon fled into the jungles in the face of Thonburi invasion. The local authorities offered no resistance. As the Thonburi forces approached Chaiya, the deputy governor of Chaiya submitted to Chakri Mud. King Taksin then made the deputy governor the new governor of Chaiya.

Battle of Thamak 
Chaophraya Nakhon Nu, upon learning of the Thonburi invasion, assembled his Ligorian forces at Tha Mak (around modern Sichon District) to the north of the Nakhon Si Thammarat city. Chaophraya Chakri Mud led the Thonburi forces to cross the Tapi River and met the Ligorian forces at Thamak, leading to the Battle of Thamak in 1769. The Ligorian forces prevailed. Phraya Siphiphat and Phraya Phetchaburi were killed in battle. Khun Laksamana, a son of Chakri Mud, was captured by the Ligorians. Chakri Mud was then compelled to retreat his armies back to Chaiya. Phraya Yommaraj sent a report to King Taksin at Thonburi, accusing Chaophraya Chakri Mud of incompetency and sedition.

Conquest of Nakhon Si Thammarat 

King Taksin realized that the campaign would be unsuccessful without his direct royal leadership. Taksin assembled his royal navy fleet of 10,000 men and 10,000 oarsmen. From Thonburi, Taksin sailed his royal fleet out of Paknam down south in August 1769. On August 20, the royal fleet met a very strong monsoon. According to Thai chronicles, King Taksin performed a ritual to appease the local seaborne spirits and the storm miraculously abated. Taksin disembarked at Chaiya and commanded Phraya Phichairacha to join with Chaophraya Chakri Mud to take Nakhon Si Thammarat as vanguard. Taksin then proceeded from Chaiya to Ligor, crossing the Tapi river.

The Ligorian forces had been taking position at Thamak. Phraya Yommaraj led the Thonburi forces to successfully defeat the Ligorians at Thamak. King Taksin and his royal fleet reached Nakhon Si Thammarat on September 21. Taksin led the attacks on the Ligor city. Chaophraya Nakhon Nu assigned his nephew-in-law and heir Chan to take the defensive position at Tha Pho in the northern outskirts. However, Chan was defeated by the royal forces of King Taksin. Chaophraya Nakhon Nu the ruler of Ligor then hurriedly took his family, including his daughters and his son-in-law Prince Phat, to flee to Songkhla. King Taksin took the city of Nakhon Si Thammarat on September 21, 1769. Chan the heir and followers of Nakhon Nu were captured by the Thonburi forces.

Pursuit of Chaophraya Nakhon Nu 
At Songkhla, Luang Songkhla Vithien the governor of Songkhla took Nakhon Nu and his family to flee further to Pattani. Nakhon Nu was joined in refuge by the governors of Songkhla and Phatthalung (The governor of Phatthalung was Phra Phimol or Pia Pimon – the husband of Lady Chan). King Taksin embarked on the campaign to pursue and capture Chaophraya Nakhon Nu. Taksin commanded Phraya Phichairacha to lead the Thonburi armies and Chakri Mud to lead the navy to pursue Nakhon Nu to Songkhla. King Taksin and the royal fleet left Nakhon Si Thammarat on October 6 for Songkhla. Phichairacha and Chakri Mud were informed that Nakhon Nu had already taken refuge in Pattani so they sent a letter to the Sultan of Pattani, urging the sultan to surrender Nakhon Nu and his family. Sultan Muhammad of Pattani was in no position to protect the fugitives and decided to turn the governors of Ligor, Songkhla and Phatthalung over to the Siamese to avoid attack. Nakhon Nu and his family were then captured and sent to Taksin at Songkhla. King Taksin took his political captives back to Nakhon Si Thammarat on November 10, 1769.

King Taksin generously distributed cash and food to the local population of Nakhon Si Thammarat and gave money, rice and robes to the Buddhist monks. In December 1769, Taksin held a three-day celebration event at Wat Phra Mahathat in Ligor. Thonburi officials proposed to execute Chaophraya Nakhon Nu but King Taksin said otherwise. Taksin stated that Nakhon Nu, like Taksin himself, emerged as a leader out of the necessities and inevitability of the situation, in which anarchy prevailed, and should be credited with the defense of southern Siamese frontiers. King Taksin spared the life of Chaophraya Nakhon Nu but took him and his family back to Thonburi to be in custody in March 1770. Taksin appointed his own nephew Prince Chao Nara Suriyawong to be the new governor of Nakhon Si Thammarat under the Thonburi regime.

Aftermath 
Chaophraya Nakhon Nu spent seven years of exile in Thonburi. His daughter Lady Chim became a consort of King Taksin and bore him sons. Nakhon Nu and his household were initially placed under house arrest inside the Thonburi city wall. After two years, Nakhon Nu was allowed to establish his own residential compounds at Ban Kruay. Consort Chim was later made Queen Krom Boricha Phakdi Si Sudarak. When Prince Nara Suriyawong of Ligor died in 1776, King Taksin decided to reinstate Nakhon Nu as the governor of Ligor. The king also granted a special status to Nakhon Nu as the 'King of Nakhon Si Thammarat' with the regnal title Phra Chao Khattiya Ratchanikhom. Nakhon Nu would remain an autonomous ruler in Ligor until the end of Thonburi regime in 1782.

Conquest of Northern Siam

Origin of Chao Phra Fang 
Chao Phra Fang was originally a Northern Siamese named Ruean. He travelled to Ayutthaya to study Buddhist Pāli canon and was later appointed as an abbot or patriarch of the Wat Phra Fang temple in the town of Fang (now called Sawangkhaburi in modern Tambon Pha Chuk, Uttaradit) in the northernmost Siamese frontiers. After the Fall of Ayutthaya in 1767, the monk Ruean found a white elephant, which was the auspicious symbol of kingship. Ruean then declared himself a ruler in Sawangkhaburi, claiming supernatural powers. He was known epithetically as Chao Phra Fang or 'the Lord of Fang'. Chao Phra Fang appointed his fellow red-robe-clad monks to be his military commanders. Chao Phra Fang led his forces to lay siege and seize Phitsanulok, incorporating the whole Hua Mueang Neua or Northern Siam of the Phitsanulok regime into his theocratic regime. His dominions stretched from Sawangkhaburi in the north to Nakhon Sawan to the south, becoming a formidable opponent of King Taksin by 1770. King Taksin repeatedly condemned Chao Phra Fang as a heterodox monk as Chao Phra Fang had violated the Buddhist Vinaya by engaging in worldly affairs and warfare.

Conquest of Phitsanulok 
In May 1770, Chao Phra Fang sent his forces south to pillage the towns of Uthaithai and Chainat for food and resources. The enraged King Taksin was then poised to subjugate and finish the Northern Siamese regime of Chao Phra Fang once and for all. On July 11, 1770, King Taksin assembled his troops of 10,000 men to attack Phitsanulok in the north;

 Chaophraya Phichairacha would lead the forces of 5,000 men to attack Phitsanulok, taking the western route.
 As Phraya Yommaraj had died, Taksin appointed Phraya Anuchitracha Boonma to be the new Phraya Yommaraj. King Taksin assigned Phraya Yommaraj Boonma to lead the forces of 5,000 men to attack Phitsanulok, taking the eastern route.

King Taksin also raised his own royal army of 12,000 men to invade Phitsanulok. Phraya Phiphit the acting Phrakhlang, in the name of Thonburi court, had earlier requested the purchase of Western flintlock firearms from the Supreme Government of the Dutch East Indies at Batavia in January 1769. In July 1770, the 2,200 flintlock muskets arrived in Thonburi from Batavia and Terengganu. King Taksin left Thonburi to the north with his royal forces on July 21, 1770. The king marched through Nakhon Sawan and reached Pakphing, an important strategic position locating south of the Phitsanulok city, on August 18, outpacing his vanguard troops who had not yet arrived.

Chao Phra Fang sent Luang Kosa Yang, who had earlier served Chaophraya Phitsanulok Rueang and had previously defeated King Taksin in the Battle of Koeichai in 1768, to defend Phitsanulok. King Taksin sent his royal forces to quickly take Phitsanulok on August 8, 1770, defeating his former nemesis Luang Kosa Yang who fled and disappeared. King Taksin entered Phitsanulok the next day on August 19, worshipping Phra Phuttha Chinnasi and Phra Phuttha Chinnaraj Buddha images at Wat Phra Si Rattana Mahathat in Phitsanulok. Phraya Yommaraj Boonma arrived in Phitsanulok nine days later and Chaophraya Phichairacha another two days later. Taksin then ordered his two vanguard commanders to proceed to Sawangkhaburi. The water level in the Nan River was low and difficult for the riverine fleet to get through. King Taksin then said that the water level would soon rise. The waters rose three days later, miraculously.

Conquest of Sawangkhaburi 
In August 1770, the two vanguard commanders; Chaophraya Phichairacha and Phraya Yommaraj Boonma proceeded to attack Sawangkhaburi. The town of Fang Sawangkhaburi itself was a small wooden fort without a proper city wall. The Thonburi forces laid siege on the town. During the siege, an elephant under the care of Chao Phra Fang gave birth to a young white elephant cub. White elephant was the symbol of the sacred kingship. Chao Phra Fang was shocked as this might be an omen suggesting that the kingship belonged to Taksin. King Taksin, upon learning about the white elephant, was also determined to possess the elephant. Thonburi besiegers easily took Sawangkhaburi. Chao Phra Fang fled into hiding along with the young white elephant.

King Taksin and the royal riparian fleet left Phitsanulok on August 13, sailing north to Sawangkhaburi. Three days later, on August 16, 1770, King Taksin was informed that Sawangkhaburi had fallen to the Thonburi forces and Chao Phra Fang had escaped. Taksin encamped his armies at Khung Taphao. Minor officials managed to catch the young white elephant and brought it to the king on August 19. On August 30, Taksin marched eastward to the Nam Muet canal in efforts to pursue Chao Phra Fang but instead met with Northern Siamese people who had fled into the forests during the warfare. King Taksin encouraged the dispersed people to return to their homes with the king himself returning to Khung Taphao. Taksin then ordered a large-scale search for Chao Phra Fang but was not successful. The Thonburi forces captured the monks who had been military commanders under Chao Phra Fang. King Taksin had them defrocked and deported to Thonburi to be imprisoned.

Purge of Northern Siamese Sangha 
On September 25, 1770, King Taksin at Sawangkhaburi declared that all of the Northern Siamese Sangha monks of the Hua Mueang Nuea or Northern Siam were followers of the heretical Chao Phra Fang and, therefore, corrupted. Taksin then ordered the massive laicization of the whole Northern Siamese Sangha. Those who wished to retain their monkhood should undergo a traditional judicial trial. Monks were put to dive into the water in a specific time to prove their innocence as their own sanctity would help them accomplish the task. Those monks who managed to dive long enough were allowed to retain their monkhood, while those who failed were defrocked, whipped and tattooed. King Taksin presided over a grand ceremony to purify the Northern Siamese Sangha, in which sacrifices were made and white clothes were raised to form the holy compounds for the monks to perform their miraculous trials. These events served to purge Northern Siam of any remaining Chao Phra Fang's sympathizers. The robes of the defrocked monks were burnt to get the dye to paint the chedi of Wat Phra Fang Sawangkhaburi temple.

After the purge of Northern Siamese monks, King Taksin appointed fifty Central Siamese monks from Thonburi to be the abbots of various head temples in Northern Siam in Sawangkhaburi, Phichai, Phitsanulok, Sukhothai and Thung Yang. King Taksin held a three-day celebration event at Wat Phra Fang Sawangkhaburi temple on October 14. On October 21, 1770, Taksin returned to Phitsanulok and held another celebration event at Wat Phra Si Rattana Mahathat.

Aftermath 
As King Taksin took control of Hua Mueang Nuea or Northern Siam, the region became the frontline battlefield between Siam and the Burmese invading from the north and the west. In October 1770, Taksin appointed his ablest and most trusted military commanders to be the governors of Northern Siamese cities;

 Chaophraya Phichairacha was made Chaophraya Sawankhalok the governor of Sawankhalok town.
 Phraya Yommaraj Boonma became Chaophraya Surasi Phitsanuwathiraj the governor of Phitsanulok.
 Phra Chiang-ngoen became Phraya Sukhothai the governor of the Sukhothai town.
 Thongdee was made Phraya Phichai the governor of Phichai town.
 Phraya Anurakphuthon was made Chaophraya Nakhon Sawan the governor of Nakhon Sawan.

Chao Phra Fang was never found and simply disappeared from history. Prince Damrong suggested that Chao Phra Fang might take refuge with the Burmese in Lanna to the north and might have instigated the Burmese to subsequently attack the Northern Siamese border towns of Sawankhalok in 1771 and Phichai in 1772–1773.

Invasion of Hà Tiên 

The last of Taksin's rivals, the Cantonese merchant ruler of Hà Tiên (Banteay Mas), Mạc Thiên Tứ, threatened Taksin's newfound hegemony over Siam by repeatingly attempting to destabilize the new Thonburi Kingdom while Taksin was away from his capital. In a final response, in 1771, Taksin launched a retaliatory land and naval assault on Hà Tiên, which resulted in Mo Thien Tu's flight from the island, ending the last serious threat to Taksin's conquests.

Conclusion 

With King Taksin's attack on the port of Hà Tiên in 1771, putting its Cantonese merchant-prince to flight, King Taksin had effectively quelled the last of his rivals over his dominance of a reunified Siam. Taksin managed to occupy almost all of the traditional Ayutthayan territories (with the exception of the Tenasserim Coast) and temporarily captured Hà Tiên, indicating Taksin's future ambitions of expanding outside Ayutthaya's sphere of influence. After the Fall of Ayutthaya in 1767, Siam ran the risk of permanent fragmentation into different Thai states. Among the regional leaders, only Taksin made his visionary intention clear that Siam should be unified under his rulership. Efforts by King Taksin to expel the Burmese, subjugate the rival regimes and to unify the kingdom made sure that Siam would remain cohesive as a political and cultural entity. In response to the calamity of 1767, a new Siam emerged with confidence in its ability to lead the region. The successes enabled the Siamese sphere of influence to expand even further afield, within a decade or so.

Burma and China finally agreed to a truce in December 1769 and the Sino-Burmese War was reluctantly put to the end. It took a while for the Burmese King Hsinbyushin to realize in 1772 that Siam had recovered and emerged under the new Thonburi regime as the Burmese king initiated his new campaigns to subjugate Siam. However, Siam proved to be more prepared in the face of Burmese invasions than it used to be previously. This eventually culminated in the Burmese–Siamese War (1775–1776), a war that could have destroyed Siam, according to historian Nidhi Eoseewong, and devastated the Northern Cities and Lan Na, depopulating the two regions until well into the 19th century.

See also 
King Taksin the Great
Thonburi Kingdom

References

Citations

Sources
  (Hardback),  (Paperback).

Thonburi Kingdom
Military history of Thailand
Wars involving the Thonburi Kingdom
Conflicts in 1767
Conflicts in 1768
Conflicts in 1769
Conflicts in 1770
1760s in Asia
1770s in Asia
1700s in Asia
1767 in Asia
1768 in Asia
1769 in Asia
1770 in Asia
1771 in Asia
18th century in Siam
1760s in Thailand
1770s in Thailand
1767 in Thailand
1768 in Thailand
1769 in Thailand
1770 in Thailand